A tree structure, tree diagram, or tree model is a way of representing the hierarchical nature of a structure in a graphical form. It is named a "tree structure" because the classic representation resembles a tree, although the chart is generally upside down compared to a biological tree, with the "stem" at the top and the "leaves" at the bottom.

A tree structure is conceptual, and appears in several forms. For a discussion of tree structures in specific fields, see Tree (data structure) for computer science; insofar as it relates to graph theory, see  tree (graph theory) or tree (set theory). Other related articles are listed below.

Terminology and properties
The tree elements are called "nodes".
The lines connecting elements are called "branches". 
Nodes without children are called leaf nodes, "end-nodes", or "leaves".

Every finite tree structure has a member that has no superior. This member is called the "root" or root node. The root is the starting node. But the converse is not true: infinite tree structures may or may not have a root node.

The names of relationships between nodes model the kinship terminology of family relations. The gender-neutral names "parent" and "child" have largely displaced the older "father" and "son" terminology. The term "uncle" is still widely used for other nodes at the same level as the parent, although it is sometimes replaced with gender-neutral terms like "ommer".

 A node's "parent" is a node one step higher in the hierarchy (i.e. closer to the root node) and lying on the same branch.
 "Sibling" ("brother" or "sister") nodes share the same parent node.
 A node's "uncles" (sometimes "ommers") are siblings of that node's parent.
 A node that is connected to all lower-level nodes is called an "ancestor".  The connected lower-level nodes are "descendants" of the ancestor node.

In the example, "encyclopedia" is the parent of "science" and "culture", its children.  "Art" and "craft" are siblings, and children of "culture", which is their parent and thus one of their ancestors.  Also, "encyclopedia", as the root of the tree, is the ancestor of "science", "culture", "art" and "craft".  Finally, "science", "art" and "craft", as leaves, are ancestors of no other node.

Tree structures can depict all kinds of taxonomic knowledge, such as family trees, the biological evolutionary tree, the evolutionary tree of a language family, the grammatical structure of a language (a key example being S → NP VP, meaning a sentence is a noun phrase and a verb phrase, with each in turn having other components which have other components), the way web pages are logically ordered in a web site, mathematical trees of integer sets, et cetera.

The Oxford English Dictionary records use of both the terms "tree structure" and "tree-diagram" from 1965 in Noam Chomsky's Aspects of the Theory of Syntax.

In a tree structure there is one and only one path from any point to any other point.

Computer science uses tree structures extensively (see Tree (data structure) and telecommunications.)

For a formal definition see set theory, and for a generalization in which children are not necessarily successors, see prefix order.

Examples of tree structures 

 Internet:
 usenet hierarchy
 Vacuum tubes
 Document Object Model's logical structure, Yahoo! subject index, Curlie
 Operating system: directory structure
 Information management: Dewey Decimal System, PSH, this hierarchical bulleted list
 Management: hierarchical organizational structures
 Computer Science:
 binary search tree
 red–black tree
 AVL tree
 R-tree
 Biology: evolutionary tree
 Business: pyramid selling scheme
 Project management: work breakdown structure
 Linguistics:
 (Syntax) Phrase structure trees
 (Historical Linguistics) Tree model of language change
 Sports: business chess, playoffs brackets
 Mathematics: Von Neumann universe
 Group theory: descendant trees

Representing trees 
There are many ways of visually representing tree structures.
Almost always, these boil down to variations, or combinations,
of a few basic styles:

Classical node-link diagrams 
Classical node-link diagrams, that connect nodes together with line segments:

Nested sets 
 Nested sets that use enclosure/containment to show parenthood, examples include TreeMaps, fractal maps, and Euler diagrams:

Layered "icicle" diagrams 
Layered "icicle" diagrams that use alignment/adjacency.

Outlines and tree views 

Lists or diagrams that use indentation, sometimes called "outlines" or "tree views".

An outline:
encyclopedia
culture
art
craft
science

A tree view:
encyclopedia
culture
art
craft
science

Nested parentheses 

A correspondence to nested parentheses was first noticed by Sir Arthur Cayley:
((art,craft)culture,science)encyclopedia
or
encyclopedia(culture(art,craft),science)

Radial trees 

Trees can also be represented radially:

See also 
Kinds of trees
 B-tree
 Dancing tree
 Decision tree
 Left-child right-sibling binary tree
 Porphyrian tree
 Tree (data structure)
 Tree (graph theory)
 Tree (set theory)

Related articles
 Data drilling
 Hierarchical model: clustering and query
 Tree testing

References

Further reading 
Identification of some of the basic styles of tree structures can be found in:
Jacques Bertin, Semiology of Graphics, 1983,  University of Wisconsin Press (2nd edition 1973, ;

Brian Johnson and Ben Shneiderman, "Tree-maps: A space-filling approach to the visualization of hierarchical information structures", in Proceedings of IEEE Visualization (VIS), 1991, pp. 284–291, ;
Peter Eades, Tao Lin, and Xuemin Lin, "Two Tree Drawing Conventions", International Journal of Computational Geometry and Applications, 1993, volume 3, number 2, pp. 133–153.

External links 

 Visualization of phylogenetic trees on the T-REX server
 Using a tree structure to design a business process – from the Society for Technical Communication

Trees (data structures)

de:Baum (Datenstruktur)
pl:Struktura drzewiasta